Henry Maier Festival Park is a 75-acre festival park located in Milwaukee, Wisconsin on the shore Lake Michigan and is the site of the annual Summerfest musical festival and the home of the American Family Insurance Amphitheater.

History

Before Summerfest 
In 1927 Maitland Airport was opened. It was one of the city's first airstrips. The airport remained in operation for more than 20 years before it was replaced by a Nike missile installation, established during the height of '50s Cold War tensions. The site was one of eight in the Greater Milwaukee area and hosted both the Nike Ajax and nuclear-capable Nike Hercules missiles as a means of last resort against a possible attack by the Soviet Union. The military installation, along with a radar station at Lake Park, remained in use until 1969 when the Army closed them in an effort to reduce costs.

The land was then sold to the city and became a top possible destination by Summerfest's early leaders, who worried for the fest's future after bad weather caused a poor turnout in its second year. Organizers believed that a centralized location was crucial, and the lakefront site appeared ideal.

In 1970, the Harbor Commission, which took ownership of the land from the Army, constructed a deal and began leasing the site to Summerfest for one dollar a year. The recently formed Summerfest quickly set up makeshift offices from the remaining barracks and the control building.

Summerfest 
The history of the Henry Maier Festival Park starts with Summerfest in 1968. The music festival was created that year, and found some success, being held in 35 different locations. The next year, however, was inundated with horrific weather, forcing cancellation of the last day and ensuring financial losses for that year. In 1970 a central location was decided upon: an abandoned strip of land along the lakefront in the downtown area, which was the former Maitland Airport and served as a Nike missile site during the Cold War.

The early Summerfest Grounds consisted of little more than concrete blocks with wooden slabs placed on top to serve as stages, in the middle of a grassy, muddy field. Despite this, the central location was key to the festival's success, ensuring the existence and expansion of the grounds. Construction continued through the 1970s and 1980s, with the highlight of the creation of the Marcus Amphitheater, a 23,000 seat partially covered venue, in 1987.

Festivals 

Various ethnic and cultural festivals came to be held at the festival park beginning in the 1980s, as well as several run/walks for charity events.

African World Festival 
Arab World Fest
Asian Moon Festival
Festa Italiana
German Fest
Indian Summer Festival
Irish Fest
Labor Fest
Mexican Fiesta
Polish Fest
PrideFest

See also
 Summerfest
 American Family Insurance Amphitheater

References

External links
Official website
History of Summerfest (including the grounds)
Maitland Airport & Military Reservation details and images

 
Economy of Milwaukee
Culture of Milwaukee
Landmarks in Wisconsin
Tourism in Wisconsin
Tourist attractions in Milwaukee
Festival venues in the United States
1970 establishments in Wisconsin
Event venues established in 1970